Feral is a 2012 American animated short film by Daniel Sousa.

Plot
A feral boy is found in the woods and brought back to live in society. Uncomfortable in this new environment, the boy tries to adapt by using the same strategies and tactics that kept him safe in the wild.

Release
Feral premiered January 19, 2013 at the Sundance Film Festival in Park City, Utah

Accolades

References

External links
 
 
  at Daniel Sousa
 

2012 films
2012 drama films
2012 animated films
2012 short films
2010s animated short films
American animated short films
2010s English-language films